Kuznetsk Metallurgists Sports Palace is an indoor sporting arena located in Novokuznetsk, Russia.  The capacity of the arena is 8,000.  It is the home arena of the Metallurg Novokuznetsk ice hockey team.

References 
Arena Information 

Indoor ice hockey venues in Russia
Indoor arenas in Russia
Sport in Novokuznetsk
Metallurg Novokuznetsk
Buildings and structures in Kemerovo Oblast
Kontinental Hockey League venues